Vitold Antonovich Manastyrsky (January 11, 1915 – June 23, 1992) was a Soviet artist, painter, graphic artist, and teacher.

Manastyrsky was born in Lviv in the family of the Ukrainian artist Antin Manastyrsky. Vitold Antonovich received his initial artistic education at the Lviv Art School (1929–1934), and graduated from the Academy of Fine Arts in Warsaw (1935–1939).

Manastyrsky was a participant in many regional and international exhibitions. The artist taught drawing and painting at the Lviv Art-Industrial College (now the Ivan Trush Applied Arts College) and was an instructor at The Lviv National Academy of Arts since it opened. Manastyrsky died on June 23, 1992 and was buried in the Lychakiv cemetery.

External links
Entry in the Encyclopedia of Ukraine	
 Painting by Manastyrsky in the collection of the Warsaw National Museum

Academic staff of the Lviv National Academy of Arts
1915 births
Academy of Fine Arts in Warsaw alumni
1992 deaths
Burials at Lychakiv Cemetery
Soviet painters
People from the Kingdom of Galicia and Lodomeria